The 1997–98 Philadelphia Flyers season was the Philadelphia Flyers 31st season in the National Hockey League (NHL). The Flyers lost their quarterfinal series with the Buffalo Sabres in five games.

Off-season
Less than a week after losing game four of the Stanley Cup Finals, head coach Terry Murray was fired. San Jose Sharks assistant coach Wayne Cashman was named his replacement on July 7, 1997.

The Flyers made two major acquisitions during the summer. On July 14, unrestricted free agent defenseman Luke Richardson, formerly of the Edmonton Oilers, signed a five-year, $12.6 million contract. A month later the Flyers signed Group II restricted free agent centerman Chris Gratton of the Tampa Bay Lightning to a five-year, $16.5 million offer sheet which included a $9 million signing bonus. However, Tampa Bay claimed they had traded Gratton to the Chicago Blackhawks before the Flyers had signed Gratton. An arbitrator dismissed this and another claim that the offer sheet was illegible because the contract figures were smeared. Fearing Tampa Bay would match, the Flyers agreed to send defenseman Karl Dykhuis and right winger Mikael Renberg to the Lightning in exchange for the four first-round picks Tampa Bay would receive if they did not match.

34-year-old forward Dale Hawerchuk announced his retirement on August 25, 1997, due to a degenerative left hip.

Regular season
With the acquisitions of Gratton and Richardson, the Flyers were expected to make another Stanley Cup run. A 7–3–1 start came crashing down as the Devils posted a 5–0 road win on October 27. Although the club finished the calendar year with an 8–0 strafing of Vancouver on New Year's Eve and began 1998 with a 7–2 road win over Ottawa, there were signs of trouble for Wayne Cashman's team - notably bad shutout home losses to San Jose in November and Boston in early December.

In a move which shocked many in Philadelphia and around the NHL, Cashman was reassigned as assistant coach and Roger Neilson elevated to head coach following a 4–3 overtime victory against Pittsburgh on March 8.

The decision didn't seem to pay off, and after a 5–4 overtime win over the New York Rangers on March 22, the team limped to a 6–8–0 finish, including back-to-back 2–1 losses to the Rangers and Bruins to end the year.

On April 13 in a nationally televised 2–1 loss in Buffalo, John LeClair scored his 50th goal of the season, becoming the first American-born player to score 50 goals in three straight seasons.

Season standings

Playoffs
In a season in which the Flyers – despite a hard fall to the Detroit Red Wings the previous year – were heavily favored to repeat as Eastern champs and return to the Finals, they never came close, as they were dominated in the first round by the Buffalo Sabres in five games.

Schedule and results

Regular season

|- style="background:#cfc;"
| 1 || October 1 || Florida Panthers || 3–1 || 1–0–0 || 2 || 
|- style="background:#cfc;"
| 2 || October 3 || Ottawa Senators || 5–3 || 2–0–0 || 4 || 
|- style="background:#fcf;"
| 3 || October 5 || Phoenix Coyotes || 1–2 || 2–1–0 || 4 || 
|- style="background:#fcf;"
| 4 || October 8 || @ New Jersey Devils || 1–4 || 2–2–0 || 4 || 
|- style="background:#cfc;"
| 5 || October 9 || Pittsburgh Penguins || 3–1 || 3–2–0 || 6 || 
|- style="background:#cfc;"
| 6 || October 11 || @ Montreal Canadiens || 6–2 || 4–2–0 || 8 || 
|- style="background:#cfc;"
| 7 || October 13 || @ San Jose Sharks || 3–2 OT || 5–2–0 || 10 || 
|- style="background:#ffc;"
| 8 || October 15 || @ Mighty Ducks of Anaheim || 2–2 OT || 5–2–1 || 11 || 
|- style="background:#fcf;"
| 9 || October 17 || @ Los Angeles Kings || 1–5 || 5–3–1 || 11 || 
|- style="background:#cfc;"
| 10 || October 21 || Tampa Bay Lightning || 7–1 || 6–3–1 || 13 || 
|- style="background:#cfc;"
| 11 || October 23 || Calgary Flames || 4–3 || 7–3–1 || 15 || 
|- style="background:#fcf;"
| 12 || October 27 || New Jersey Devils || 0–5 || 7–4–1 || 15 || 
|- style="background:#fcf;"
| 13 || October 29 || St. Louis Blues || 2–3 || 7–5–1 || 15 || 
|- style="background:#ffc;"
| 14 || October 31 || @ Washington Capitals || 2–2 OT || 7–5–2 || 16 || 
|-

|- style="background:#ffc;"
| 15 || November 2 || Dallas Stars || 3–3 OT || 7–5–3 || 17 || 
|- style="background:#cfc;"
| 16 || November 3 || @ St. Louis Blues || 5–1 || 8–5–3 || 19 || 
|- style="background:#cfc;"
| 17 || November 6 || Edmonton Oilers || 6–2 || 9–5–3 || 21 || 
|- style="background:#cfc;"
| 18 || November 8 || @ Ottawa Senators || 4–3 || 10–5–3 || 23 || 
|- style="background:#cfc;"
| 19 || November 11 || Ottawa Senators || 1–0 || 11–5–3 || 25 || 
|- style="background:#fcf;"
| 20 || November 13 || Colorado Avalanche || 1–2 || 11–6–3 || 25 || 
|- style="background:#cfc;"
| 21 || November 14 || @ Florida Panthers || 5–2 || 12–6–3 || 27 || 
|- style="background:#cfc;"
| 22 || November 16 || Tampa Bay Lightning || 3–2 || 13–6–3 || 29 || 
|- style="background:#fcf;"
| 23 || November 19 || @ Toronto Maple Leafs || 1–3 || 13–7–3 || 29 || 
|- style="background:#fcf;"
| 24 || November 20 || San Jose Sharks || 0–3 || 13–8–3 || 29 || 
|- style="background:#cfc;"
| 25 || November 26 || @ Buffalo Sabres || 3–1 || 14–8–3 || 31 || 
|- style="background:#cfc;"
| 26 || November 28 || New York Islanders || 4–1 || 15–8–3 || 33 || 
|- style="background:#ffc;"
| 27 || November 29 || @ Tampa Bay Lightning || 3–3 OT || 15–8–4 || 34 || 
|-

|- style="background:#ffc;"
| 28 || December 1 || Buffalo Sabres || 1–1 OT || 15–8–5 || 35 || 
|- style="background:#fcf;"
| 29 || December 3 || Boston Bruins || 0–3 || 15–9–5 || 35 || 
|- style="background:#ffc;"
| 30 || December 5 || @ New York Rangers || 4–4 OT || 15–9–6 || 36 || 
|- style="background:#cfc;"
| 31 || December 11 || New York Islanders || 4–3 || 16–9–6 || 38 || 
|- style="background:#cfc;"
| 32 || December 12 || @ Chicago Blackhawks || 3–2 || 17–9–6 || 40 || 
|- style="background:#cfc;"
| 33 || December 14 || Tampa Bay Lightning || 3–0 || 18–9–6 || 42 || 
|- style="background:#cfc;"
| 34 || December 15 || @ Montreal Canadiens || 3–1 || 19–9–6 || 44 || 
|- style="background:#ffc;"
| 35 || December 18 || Boston Bruins || 2–2 OT || 19–9–7 || 45 || 
|- style="background:#cfc;"
| 36 || December 20 || Florida Panthers || 2–0 || 20–9–7 || 47 || 
|- style="background:#cfc;"
| 37 || December 23 || Carolina Hurricanes || 4–2 || 21–9–7 || 49 || 
|- style="background:#fcf;"
| 38 || December 27 || @ Calgary Flames || 2–5 || 21–10–7 || 49 || 
|- style="background:#cfc;"
| 39 || December 30 || @ Edmonton Oilers || 3–1 || 22–10–7 || 51 || 
|- style="background:#cfc;"
| 40 || December 31 || @ Vancouver Canucks || 8–0 || 23–10–7 || 53 || 
|-

|- style="background:#cfc;"
| 41 || January 3 || @ Ottawa Senators || 7–2 || 24–10–7 || 55 || 
|- style="background:#ffc;"
| 42 || January 8 || @ Carolina Hurricanes || 3–3 OT || 24–10–8 || 56 || 
|- style="background:#fcf;"
| 43 || January 9 || @ Washington Capitals || 1–4 || 24–11–8 || 56 || 
|- style="background:#cfc;"
| 44 || January 11 || @ Tampa Bay Lightning || 5–2 || 25–11–8 || 58 || 
|- style="background:#ffc;"
| 45 || January 14 || Montreal Canadiens || 3–3 OT || 25–11–9 || 59 || 
|- style="background:#cfc;"
| 46 || January 20 || Buffalo Sabres || 3–0 || 26–11–9 || 61 || 
|- style="background:#cfc;"
| 47 || January 22 || @ New York Rangers || 4–3 || 27–11–9 || 63 || 
|- style="background:#fcf;"
| 48 || January 24 || @ Detroit Red Wings || 0–1 || 27–12–9 || 63 || 
|- style="background:#cfc;"
| 49 || January 26 || New York Islanders || 3–1 || 28–12–9 || 65 || 
|- style="background:#fcf;"
| 50 || January 28 || @ New York Islanders || 1–6 || 28–13–9 || 65 || 
|- style="background:#fcf;"
| 51 || January 29 || Montreal Canadiens || 2–3 || 28–14–9 || 65 || 
|- style="background:#fcf;"
| 52 || January 31 || Washington Capitals || 2–3 OT || 28–15–9 || 65 || 
|-

|- style="background:#fcf;"
| 53 || February 4 || @ Dallas Stars || 0–1 || 28–16–9 || 65 || 
|- style="background:#cfc;"
| 54 || February 5 || @ Phoenix Coyotes || 6–2 || 29–16–9 || 67 || 
|- style="background:#fcf;"
| 55 || February 7 || @ Colorado Avalanche || 2–3 || 29–17–9 || 67 || 
|- style="background:#cfc;"
| 56 || February 28 || @ New York Rangers || 3–1 || 30–17–9 || 69 || 
|-

|- style="background:#fcf;"
| 57 || March 2 || @ New Jersey Devils || 3–4 || 30–18–9 || 69 || 
|- style="background:#fcf;"
| 58 || March 3 || @ New York Islanders || 1–3 || 30–19–9 || 69 || 
|- style="background:#cfc;"
| 59 || March 5 || Washington Capitals || 3–2 || 31–19–9 || 71 || 
|- style="background:#fcf;"
| 60 || March 7 || @ Pittsburgh Penguins || 4–6 || 31–20–9 || 71 || 
|- style="background:#cfc;"
| 61 || March 8 || Pittsburgh Penguins || 4–3 OT || 32–20–9 || 73 || 
|- style="background:#ffc;"
| 62 || March 10 || New Jersey Devils || 2–2 OT || 32–20–10 || 74 || 
|- style="background:#cfc;"
| 63 || March 12 || Vancouver Canucks || 3–2 || 33–20–10 || 76 || 
|- style="background:#cfc;"
| 64 || March 14 || Detroit Red Wings || 6–1 || 34–20–10 || 78 || 
|- style="background:#cfc;"
| 65 || March 16 || Toronto Maple Leafs || 4–1 || 35–20–10 || 80 || 
|- style="background:#ffc;"
| 66 || March 19 || Mighty Ducks of Anaheim || 3–3 OT || 35–20–11 || 81 || 
|- style="background:#fcf;"
| 67 || March 21 || @ Pittsburgh Penguins || 3–4 || 35–21–11 || 81 || 
|- style="background:#cfc;"
| 68 || March 22 || New York Rangers || 5–4 OT || 36–21–11 || 83 || 
|- style="background:#fcf;"
| 69 || March 24 || @ New Jersey Devils || 2–3 || 36–22–11 || 83 || 
|- style="background:#fcf;"
| 70 || March 26 || @ Boston Bruins || 2–4 || 36–23–11 || 83 || 
|- style="background:#fcf;"
| 71 || March 28 || Carolina Hurricanes || 2–4 || 36–24–11 || 83 || 
|- style="background:#cfc;"
| 72 || March 29 || @ Carolina Hurricanes || 3–1 || 37–24–11 || 85 || 
|- style="background:#cfc;"
| 73 || March 31 || Chicago Blackhawks || 3–2 || 38–24–11 || 87 || 
|-

|- style="background:#cfc;"
| 74 || April 2 || Los Angeles Kings || 3–0 || 39–24–11 || 89 || 
|- style="background:#fcf;"
| 75 || April 4 || Florida Panthers || 1–4 || 39–25–11 || 89 || 
|- style="background:#cfc;"
| 76 || April 8 || @ Tampa Bay Lightning || 6–1 || 40–25–11 || 91 || 
|- style="background:#fcf;"
| 77 || April 9 || @ Florida Panthers || 2–3 || 40–26–11 || 91 || 
|- style="background:#cfc;"
| 78 || April 11 || Washington Capitals || 4–3 || 41–26–11 || 93 || 
|- style="background:#fcf;"
| 79 || April 13 || @ Buffalo Sabres || 1–2 || 41–27–11 || 93 || 
|- style="background:#cfc;"
| 80 || April 16 || @ Florida Panthers || 7–3 || 42–27–11 || 95 || 
|- style="background:#fcf;"
| 81 || April 18 || New York Rangers || 1–2 || 42–28–11 || 95 || 
|- style="background:#fcf;"
| 82 || April 19 || @ Boston Bruins || 1–2 || 42–29–11 || 95 || 
|-

|-
| Legend:

Playoffs

|- style="background:#fcf;"
| 1 || April 22 || Buffalo Sabres || 2–3 || Sabres lead 1–0 || 
|- style="background:#cfc;"
| 2 || April 24 || Buffalo Sabres || 3–2 || Series tied 1–1 || 
|- style="background:#fcf;"
| 3 || April 27 || @ Buffalo Sabres || 1–6 || Sabres lead 2–1 || 
|- style="background:#fcf;"
| 4 || April 29 || @ Buffalo Sabres || 1–4 || Sabres lead 3–1 || 
|- style="background:#fcf;"
| 5 || May 1 || Buffalo Sabres || 2–3 OT || Sabres win 4–1 || 
|-

|-
| Legend:

Player statistics

Scoring
 Position abbreviations: C = Center; D = Defense; G = Goaltender; LW = Left Wing; RW = Right Wing
  = Joined team via a transaction (e.g., trade, waivers, signing) during the season. Stats reflect time with the Flyers only.
  = Left team via a transaction (e.g., trade, waivers, release) during the season. Stats reflect time with the Flyers only.

Goaltending
  = Joined team via a transaction (e.g., trade, waivers, signing) during the season. Stats reflect time with the Flyers only.
  = Left team via a transaction (e.g., trade, waivers, release) during the season. Stats reflect time with the Flyers only.

Awards and records

Awards

Records

Among the team records set during the 1997–98 season was John LeClair tying the team record for most points in a single period (4) on October 11.

Transactions
The Flyers were involved in the following transactions from June 8, 1997, the day after the deciding game of the 1997 Stanley Cup Finals, through June 16, 1998, the day of the deciding game of the 1998 Stanley Cup Finals.

Trades

Players acquired

Players lost

Signings

Draft picks

Philadelphia's picks at the 1997 NHL Entry Draft, which was held at the Civic Arena in Pittsburgh, Pennsylvania on June 21, 1997. The Flyers traded their third-round pick, 77th overall, to the Dallas Stars for the Stars' 1998 second-round pick on June 21, 1997. They also traded their fifth-round pick, 130th overall, and Bob Wilkie to the Chicago Blackhawks for Karl Dykhuis on February 16, 1995, and their seventh-round pick, 187th overall, to the Edmonton Oilers for Martin Cerven on June 18, 1997.

Farm teams
The Flyers were affiliated with the Philadelphia Phantoms of the AHL.

Notes

References
General
 
 
 
Specific

1997–98 NHL season by team
1997–98 in American ice hockey by team
1997
Philadelphia
Philadelphia